Xenorhina schiefenhoeveli is a species of frog in the family Microhylidae.
It is endemic to West Papua, Indonesia.
Its natural habitats are rocky areas, pastureland, and rural gardens.

References

Sources

Xenorhina
Amphibians of Western New Guinea
Taxonomy articles created by Polbot
Amphibians described in 1989